The A404 autoroute is a motorway in France. The road connects A40 with Oyonnax and was completed in  November 1997.

Route

Exchange A40-A404/Hauteville Junction with the A40 (Paris-Lyon-Geneva).
09 (Montreal-Le-Cluse/Nantua) 6 km Towns served: Nantua, Montreal-Le-Cluse, Izernore
 Péage de Groissiat
10 (Bellignat) 12 km: Towns served: Bellignat, Groissiat
11 (Oyonnax-Ouest) 16 km: Towns served: Oyonnax
12 (Parc Technologique Nord) 17 km: Towns served: Oyonnax, Arbent
 (St Claude) End of motorway (provisional) at a roundabout (19 km) at Arbent and RD31.

Future
The motorway A404 will be in the long term be extended to Saint-Claude and connected to the Swiss motorway network.

References

External links

 A404 Motorway in Saratlas

A404